Simonds may refer to:

People
D'Marcus Simonds (born 1997), American basketball player
Gavin Simonds, 1st Viscount Simonds (1881–1971), British judge
George Blackall Simonds (1843–1929), English sculptor
Major General George S. Simonds (1874–1938), U.S. Army officer 
Lieutenant General Guy Simonds (1903–1974), Canadian Army officer
John O. Simonds (1913–2005), American landscape architect
Justin Simonds (1890–1967), Australian clergyman
Katherine Call Simonds (1865–?), American musician, singer, author, composer, social reformer
Kenneth Simonds (1935–2009), American businessman
Merilyn Simonds (born 1949), Canadian author
Nathaniel Simonds (1775–1850), American politician
Ossian Cole Simonds (1855–1931), American landscape designer
Robert Simonds (born 1964), American film producer
William Simonds (author) (1822–1859), American author
William Blackall Simonds (1761–1834), English brewer and banker
William E. Simonds (1842–1903), American politician

Fictional characters
Matthew Simonds, Honorverse character

Organisations
H & G Simonds Ltd, a former brewing company from Reading, England
Simonds Catholic College, Melbourne, Australia
Simonds Elementary School, Langley, British Columbia, Canada
Simonds Farsons Cisk, a food and beverage conglomerate in Malta
Simonds' Regiment of Militia, Berkshire County, Massachusetts, United States

Places
Simonds Parish, Carleton County, New Brunswick, Canada
Simonds Parish, Saint John County, New Brunswick, Canada
Surnames from given names